The Indian Telly Award for Best Reality Show is an award given by IndianTelevision.com as part of its annual Indian Telly Awards for TV serials, to recognize the Best Reality Show for the year.

Winners
The following is the list of Winners of Telly Award for Best Reality Show.

References

External links
 Official Website

See also
 Indian Telly Award for Best Actor in a Lead Role – Female
 Indian Telly Award for Best Actor in a Lead Role – Male
 Indian Telly Awards

Indian Telly Awards